The Sri Damansara Sentral MRT station is a mass rapid transit (MRT) station in the suburb of Bandar Sri Damansara in Petaling Jaya, Selangor, Malaysia.

It is one of the stations on the MRT Putrajaya line. The station begin operations on 16 June 2022 as part of Phase One operations of the line.

Location 

The station is next to the meeting point of the Kepong-Kuala Selangor highway , the Kuala Lumpur Middle Ring Road 2  and the Damansara-Puchong toll road .

The station is also located close to Bandar Menjalara and Desa Park City across the Selangor-Federal Territory border.

Station features 

 Elevated station with side platforms
 Park & Ride

References

External links
 Sri Damansara East MRT Station | mrt.com.my
 Klang Valley Mass Rapid Transit website
 MRT Hawk-Eye View

Petaling District
Rapid transit stations in Selangor
Railway stations opened in 2022